Eden, a former New Zealand parliamentary electorate, lay in the general area of the suburb of Mount Eden in the city of Auckland.

Population centres
The 1870 electoral redistribution was undertaken by a parliamentary select committee based on population data from the 1867 census. Eight sub-committees were formed, with two members each making decisions for their own province; thus members set their own electorate boundaries. The number of electorates was increased from 61 to 72, and Eden was one of the new electorates.

The electorate was urban, and comprised a number of inner-city suburbs in the central-south part of Auckland.

History
The Eden electorate was created in 1871 for the 5th Parliament. The first elected representative was Robert James Creighton, who won the 1871 election. He was succeeded in 1876 by Joseph Tole, who served until 1887. Edwin Mitchelson won the 1887 election. He served three parliamentary terms until 1896, when he unsuccessfully contested the City of Auckland electorate.

John Bollard was the next representative, elected in the 1896 election. He held the electorate until 1914. Bollard was succeeded by James Parr, who won the 1914 election. Parr resigned on 26 March 1926, as he had been appointed as High Commissioner to the United Kingdom.

Rex Mason won the resulting 1926 by-election, as the Reform Party vote was split between two candidates. He held the electorate for the remainder of the term until 1928. He was succeeded by Arthur Stallworthy, who won in the 1928 election. Wilfred Fortune won Eden in 1946 and held the electorate for three terms until 1954, when he was defeated for the Onslow electorate.

Premier and Attorney-General Frederick Whitaker stood unsuccessfully for Eden in 1879; as did John Kerr in 1871.

The electorate was abolished in 1996, when it was replaced by the new MMP electorate of Epsom.

Members of Parliament
Eden was represented by 15 Members of Parliament.

Key

Election results

1993 election

1990 election

1987 election

1984 election

1981 election

1978 election

1975 election

1972 election

1969 election

1966 election

1963 election

1960 election

1957 election

1954 election

1951 election

1949 election

1946 election

1943 election

1938 election

1935 election

1931 election

1928 election

1926 by-election

1914 election

1899 election

1893 election

1890 election

1887 election

1879 election

 
 
 
 
 
 
 
 

NB: Officially there are 731 ballot papers, 9 informal votes, and 2*2 duplicate votes. After removing 13 from consideration, 718 total valid votes were counted. So technically, turnout is 729 voters.

1876 election

Notes

References

Historical electorates of New Zealand
Politics of the Auckland Region
1870 establishments in New Zealand
1996 disestablishments in New Zealand